Murder Junkies is the seventh studio album released by American punk rock musician GG Allin, recorded with Antiseen as his backing band. The album consists of spoken word by Allin, interspersed with musical tracks featuring Allin on vocals backed by Antiseen.

Background 
The title of the album was appropriated from the name of an obscure Texas band (formed entirely independently of Allin) – which performed as his backing band for several live dates in the late 1980s, a name in turn appropriated by Allin for the name of the studio band (including Allin's friend Mark Sheehan on guitar) which recorded the GG Allin and the Murder Junkies Watch Me Kill 6-track EP, released on Fuckin' A/Stomach Ache Records in 1991. The third GG Allin-related band calling itself The Murder Junkies was formed in the same year, around the time that the Allin and ANTiSEEN Murder Junkies album was recorded. This final outfit calling itself The Murder Junkies became what would prove to be Allin's last backing band.

Jeff Clayton, lead singer of ANTiSEEN, has described this album as a mixed blessing. Although he is very happy with the way it turned out, he thinks that a lot of people got the impression that they are nothing more than a backing band for Allin. Clayton has stated that Allin was very professional during the recording of the album, and he wonders how much of Allin's stage act was real and how much of it was "for the marks."

In 2003, a second CD version of the album was released by TKO Records. This version omitted Allin's spoken word material in favor of the GG Allin and Antiseen "Violence Now" 7-inch, and the GG Allin and the Carolina Shitkickers "Layin' Up With Linda" 7-inch EP. 

A version of the album (entitled Murder Junkies/Live) was also released during the 1990s by the label Baloney Shrapnel, minus the spoken word pieces and with added live tracks.

Track listing

Original New Rose Records release 
Savage Blood Bath – 0:54
Murder for the Mission – Terrorist Anarchy – 1:33
Sidewalk Walking – 0:56
I Love Nothing – 2:02
Self Absorbed – 1:55
99 Stab Wounds – Decapitation Ritual – 1:45
No Limits No Laws – 1:37
War in My Head – I'm Your Enemy – 3:01
A Dead Fuck – 1:16
Sister Sodomy – Death and Defecation – 1:28
Kill, Kill, Kill – 2:24
Violence Now – Assassinate the President – 4:05
Drink from the Pissing Snakes Mouth – 1:02
Rape, Torture, Terminate and Fuck – 1:09
Guns and Revolution – 0:40
Kill the Police – Destroy the System – 2:18
Immortal Pieces of Me – 1:56
My Prison Walls – 206045 – 3:55
Death Before Life – Bloody Cunt Slider – 0:22
I Hate People – 6:58

TKO Records reissue 
Murder for the Mission
I Love Nothing
99 Stab Wounds
War in My Head
Sister Sodomy
Violence Now
Rape, Torture, Terminate & Fuck
Kill the Police
I Hate People
My Prison Walls
Layin' Up with Linda
I Wanna Fuck the Shit Out of You
Outlaw Scumfuc

1991 albums
GG Allin albums
Antiseen albums